Movie Magic may refer to:

 Movie Magic Special Effects Show, a 1991 live show at the Warner Bros. Movie World amusement park at Oxenford, Gold Coast, Queensland, Australia
 Movie Magic Screenwriter, a word processing program first released in 1994 and intended to format screenplays, teleplays and novels
 Mega Movie Magic, an American television documentary program
 J.K. Rowling's Wizarding World: Movie Magic, a series of three volumes of Wizarding World books